Vancouver City Centre is an underground station on the Canada Line of Metro Vancouver's SkyTrain rapid transit system. The station is located on Granville Street, between West Georgia Street and Robson Street in Downtown Vancouver, and serves the shopping and entertainment districts along Granville and Robson streets, and the office and shopping complexes of Pacific Centre and Vancouver Centre.

The station is within walking distance of Robson Square (home of the Vancouver Art Gallery, the Provincial Court of British Columbia, and a UBC satellite campus), the Orpheum Theatre, Vancouver Library Square, TD Tower, Scotia Tower and the HSBC Canada Building.

History

Vancouver City Centre station opened in 2009 and is named for its location in the centre of downtown Vancouver. VIA Architecture was the architecture firm responsible for designing the station.

In 2018, TransLink announced that Vancouver City Centre station, as well as two other Canada Line stations located in downtown Vancouver, would receive an accessibility upgrade which includes additional escalators. Construction is expected to begin in early 2019 with completion by the fourth quarter of 2019.

Services

The station is located within a short walking distance of bus stops for bus services throughout Vancouver (especially the trolleybus services on Granville Mall) and to the North Shore. There are underground connections between the station and both the Pacific Centre and Vancouver Centre shopping malls. Passengers are able to reach Granville station (on the Expo Line) during regular retail hours while remaining indoors by walking through Pacific Centre or Vancouver Centre and Hudson's Bay department store, although the only direct transfer point between the Canada Line and the Expo Line is at Waterfront station.

Station information

Station layout

Entrances
Street level entrance : located at the southwest corner of the intersection of Granville Street and West Georgia Street. Elevator access at this entrance is located south of the main entrance building.
Concourse level entrances: have a direct connection to Pacific Centre and Vancouver Centre shopping malls.

Transit connections

The following bus routes can be found in close proximity to Vancouver City Centre station:

References

Canada Line stations
Railway stations in Canada opened in 2009
Buildings and structures in Vancouver
2009 establishments in British Columbia